Salim Djefaflia (born 9 October 1978 in Arles) is a French former professional footballer of Algerian descent who played as a striker. He spent one season in the Bundesliga with Hannover 96.

References

External links
 

Living people
1978 births
People from Arles
Sportspeople from Bouches-du-Rhône
Association football forwards
French footballers
Hannover 96 players
Hannover 96 II players
Holstein Kiel players
Algerian footballers
French sportspeople of Algerian descent
Bundesliga players
Expatriate footballers in Germany
Expatriate footballers in Luxembourg
Algerian expatriates in Germany
Footballers from Provence-Alpes-Côte d'Azur